Alison Grant Milbank (née Legg; born 10 October 1954) is a British Anglican priest and literary scholar specialising in religion and culture. She is Canon Theologian at Southwell Minster and a professor at the University of Nottingham in the Department of Theology and Religious Studies.

Early life and education
Milbank was born Alison Grant Legg on 10 October 1954. She studied theology and English literature at Girton College, Cambridge, graduating with a Bachelor of Arts (BA) degree in 1978; as per tradition, she proceeded to a Master of Arts (MA Cantab) degree in 1981. She undertook a year of teacher training with the University of Cambridge and completed her Postgraduate Certificate in Education (PGCE) in 1979. She then undertook postgraduate research at the University of Lancaster, completing her Doctor of Philosophy (PhD) degree in 1988.

Career

Academic career
Milbank was the John Rylands Research Institute Fellow at the University of Manchester and, after temporary lectureships at Cambridge and the University of Middlesex, taught in the English department at the University of Virginia in the United States for five years. She is now an associate professor at the University of Nottingham in the department of theology and religious studies.

Milbank's research and teaching focuses on the relation of religion to culture in the post-Enlightenment period, with particular literary interest in non-realist literary and artistic expression, such as the Gothic, the fantastic, horror and fantasy. She has published a book on the Catholic poetics of J. R. R. Tolkien and G. K. Chesterton. She is currently working on a book which will trace the theological history of the emergence of the Gothic from the pre-Reformation period to the present day.

Ordained ministry
From 2005 to 2006, Milbank trained for ordained ministry on the East Midlands Ministry Training Course. She was ordained in the Church of England as a deacon in 2006 and as a priest in 2007. From 2006 to 2009, she served her curacy at Holy Trinity Church, Lambley, Nottinghamshire, as a non-stipendiary minister. From 2009 to 2017, she was a priest vicar at Southwell Minster. Since 2017, she has been Canon Theologian of Southwell Minster: she was installed as canon during a service at the cathedral on 15 October 2017.

Personal life
In 1978, she married the theologian John Milbank. He is one of the principal exponents of radical orthodoxy.

Selected works
 God and the Gothic: Religion, Romance and Reality in the English Literary Tradition, Oxford University Press, 2018. 

Chesterton and Tolkien as theologians: the fantasy of the real, T & T Clark, 2007,

References

External links
Interview with Dr Alison Milbank author of Chesterton and Tolkien as Theologians, Tolkien Library

21st-century English Anglican priests
Alumni of Girton College, Cambridge
Alumni of Lancaster University
Academics of Middlesex University
Academics of the University of Cambridge
Academics of the University of Manchester
Academics of the University of Nottingham
Church of England priests
Living people
University of Virginia faculty
1954 births